Thomas Sherman Kerrigan (born 15 March 1939) is an American poet.

Life

He was born in Los Angeles where he still lives.  He attended the University of California and Loyola University Law School.  He was admitted to the California Bar in 1965.  He has served as President of the Irish American Bar Association and successfully defended a law created in the Great Depression to protect workers before the United States Supreme Court in 2001 (Lujan v. G&G Fire Sprinklers, Inc., 532 U.S. 189, decided April 17, 2001). He has 6 children. Sean b. 1962 Leda b. 1965 Katherine b. 1972 Hilary b. 1981 Christopher b. 1983 And Elizabeth b. 1985

Writing

His poetry has appeared in important periodicals on both sides of the Atlantic and in the Garrison Keillor anthology, Good Poems (Viking/Penguin 2002) and in Literature and Its Writers (Bedford/St. Martins 2006).  He is also the author of two produced plays and a former drama critic affiliated with the Los Angeles Drama Critics' Circle.

Publications
 Another Bloomsday at Molly Malone's Pub (The Inevitable Press, 1999) 
 The Shadow Sonnets and Other Poems (Scienter Press 2006).

Sources 
 See The Legal Studies Forum XXX, No. 1 and 2, 2006

External links 
Poems at The New Formalist
Poems at The HyperTexts

American male poets
California lawyers
Formalist poets
1939 births
Living people